Asselkhan Turlybekova (born 18 December 1998) is a Kazakhstani footballer who plays as a midfielder for Women's Championship club FC Okzhetpes and the Kazakhstan women's national team.

Career
Turlybekova has been capped for the Kazakhstan national team, appearing for the team during the 2019 FIFA Women's World Cup qualifying cycle.

International goals

References

External links
 
 
 

1998 births
Living people
Kazakhstani women's footballers
Kazakhstan women's international footballers
Women's association football midfielders